Chase is an unincorporated community in Madison County, Alabama, United States.

History
Chase was named in honor of the Chase family. Henry B. Chase served as the second mayor of Huntsville, serving from 1918 to 1920. 
The community was formerly a railroad stop. Today, it is home to the North Alabama Railroad Museum. A  post office operated under the name Chase from 1898 to 1976.

References

Unincorporated communities in Alabama
Unincorporated communities in Madison County, Alabama
Huntsville-Decatur, AL Combined Statistical Area